The 1974 Phonogram World Masters was the first major tournament on the BDO/WDF calendar for 1974. It took place from 31 August at the West Centre Hotel, Fulham.

The tournament featured the best 60 players from around the world. 24 winners of major tournaments from the last year and an English qualifying round consisting of 36 players (2 from each county). The 36 County players played down to a last 8 before joining the 24 invitees to make the first round.

Prize money
Total Prize fund was £700
Champion £400
Runner-up £200
Quarter-finalists £100
1st round losers £20

Seeds
  Cliff Inglis
  Harry Heenan
  Jack McKenna
  Douglas Melander

The results
Preliminary round (best of 5 legs)
 John Kellard 3 v 1  Joe Goldwin
 Charlie Pitchers 1 vs 3  Harry Heenan
 Ron Stoucbbury 1 vs 3  Andre DeClerq
 Barry Luckham 3 vs 2  Seamus O'Brien
 John Craine 3 vs 1  Willie Grassey
 Fredrick Turner 0 vs 3  George Lee

References

World Masters (darts)
World Masters
World Masters (darts)
World Masters (darts)
World Masters (darts)